"Kiss Me" is a song by American pop rock band Sixpence None the Richer from their self-titled third album (1997). The ballad was released as a single on August 12, 1998, in the United States and was issued in international territories the following year. Several music critics compared the song to works by English alternative rock band the Sundays, and it was nominated for a Best Pop Performance by a Duo or Group with Vocals at the 42nd Grammy Awards.

"Kiss Me" is the band's highest-charting single in the US, peaking at  2 on the Billboard Hot 100 and becoming the country's sixth-best-selling single of 1999. Worldwide, the song reached No. 1 on the Australian and Canadian charts as well as No. 4 on the UK and New Zealand charts, making it the group's highest-charting single worldwide. Three music videos were made for the song, with one paying tribute to French romantic drama film Jules and Jim and two others featuring the band in the park, watching a portable television.

Background
"Kiss Me" originated as a draft of a song written in a Netherlands motel. Lead vocalist Leigh Nash said the band had been in their rooms for about an hour when band member Matt Slocum called to let her know that he had composed a new song. Nash went on to say, "We were on tour over there, and we had a show that night at Flevo Festival. We performed it that night! I went down into his room and learned it. It was an instant hit with fans, but it was still like a year and a half before we recorded it."

The song has a more lighthearted, "poppier" sound compared to the band's prior work; thus, the band were reluctant to include it on their self-titled third album until their producer persuaded them to reconsider. Nash said early drafts of the song had "slightly edgier lyrics, with 'silver moon sparkling' originally written as 'cigarettes sparkling.'"

Release
In January 1999, Miramax used "Kiss Me" as the main theme song of its teen romantic comedy film She's All That. The film's box office success helped "Kiss Me" to gain widespread mainstream attention and chart success. In Italy, the film was retitled Kiss Me. The song was also included on Dawson's Creeks first soundtrack in April 1999.

Critical reception
Rick Anderson of AllMusic described the song as "an utterly irresistible slice of swoony guitar pop" adding that "is impossible to shake loose from the brain and could well turn out to be this generation's 'I Wanna Hold Your Hand'". Chuck Taylor and Deborah Evans Price of Billboard magazine compared the song to those recorded by the Sundays. Taylor called the song "admirably well-written" and "brightly produced", further comparing the track to 10,000 Maniacs. British music columnist James Masterton also compared "Kiss Me" to the works of the Sundays, referring to the song as a cross with a mellow Cranberries song, and called it a "wonderful tapestry of jangling guitars". Jim Kerr of Radio & Records magazine wrote that the song is an "amazing piece of alterna-pop" reminiscent of the Sundays. Larry Flick of Billboard described "Kiss Me" as a "refreshing summertime tune" with "airy" production and "romantic" imagery. Daily Record said it is an "excellent pop song".

Chart performance
"Kiss Me" debuted on the US Billboard Hot 100 at number 90 on the issue of November 28, 1998, but it fell out of the top 100 the following week. On February 13, 1999, it re-entered the listing at number 91, then took another 11 weeks to reach its peak of number two on May 1, where it stayed for a single week. It stayed in the top 100 for 33 weeks, ending 1999 as the United States' sixth-most-successful song of the year. The single additionally peaked atop the Billboard Mainstream Top 40 chart and reached number two on the Adult Contemporary and Adult Top 40 charts. In Canada, "Kiss Me" debuted at number 45 on the RPM Top Singles chart on March 22 and rose to number one on May 10, becoming Canada's 11th-best-performing hit of 1999. It topped the RPM Adult Contemporary chart as well.

The track reached number one in Australia, where it stayed for three weeks in June 1999 following a four-week climb up the ARIA Singles Chart. It appeared at number 19 on the Australian year-end chart of 1999. In New Zealand, "Kiss Me" debuted at number 16 in May and rose to its peak of number four on July 18, spending 15 weeks in the top 50 and ending the year at number 44 on the RIANZ year-end chart. The song became a hit in several European countries, reaching the top 10 in Austria, Flanders, Germany, Greece, Hungary, Ireland, Italy, Norway, Switzerland, and the United Kingdom. It peaked within the top 20 in Iceland, the Netherlands, Sweden, and Wallonia, attaining a peak of number 15 on the Eurochart Hot 100. In France, it rose to number 32 in September 1999. "Kiss Me" has earned several certifications, earning platinum discs in Australia and the United Kingdom and gold discs in Belgium, New Zealand, and the US (digital and physical).

Music videos

Sixpence None the Richer version
The original music video, directed by producer Steve Taylor and filmed in Paris, France, pays tribute to French filmmaker François Truffaut and his film Jules et Jim, made in black and white and recreating many of the classic scenes from the film. Two alternate versions of the video were also released later, which featured the band sitting on a park bench, performing and watching scenes from either She's All That or Dawson's Creek on a portable television or projected on an outdoor screen. Freddie Prinze Jr. and Rachael Leigh Cook appeared in the She's All That version of the video. The Dawson's Creek version of the video became VH1's number-one video for the entire month of May 1999.

New Found Glory version
The music video for New Found Glory's cover version revolves around a large group of teenagers who construct a tree house out of mattresses, and throw a raucous garden party involving pillow fights and kissing, while the members of the band, along with the members of Paramore, perform the song around them. While the bands perform, a young man, played by drummer Chase Dodds of the band Classic Addict, sets off on a mission to kiss as many girls as possible during the party, keeping a tally on his inner left forearm in black pen. After narrowly avoiding kissing a man (whom he mistakes for a girl because of his long hair), Chase attempts to kiss Paramore's lead singer, Hayley Williams, only to have her recognize the tally on his arm, and slap him in the face, knocking him to the ground. He is then set upon by all the girls he has kissed at the party, who then proceed to strip him of his shirt and tie him to a nearby tree with duct tape. One of the girls tapes his mouth shut, before writing "kiss me" on his chest in black ink. The girls then rejoin the party, leaving Chase tied to the tree.

Legacy
In an interview with Vogue, Taylor Swift said that "Kiss Me" was the very first song that she learned to play on guitar, when she was 12 years old.

Track listings

US Christian retail single
 "Kiss Me" (radio remix) – 3:21
 "Kiss Me" (album edit)  – 3:02
 "Sad but True" – 3:59
 "Kiss Me" (live in Hollywood 2.12.98) – 3:29

US cassette single
 "Kiss Me"
 "Love"

UK CD single
 "Kiss Me" (radio remix) – 3:18
 "Sad but True" – 3:57
 "Kiss Me" (live in Hollywood 2.12.98) – 3:28

UK cassette single
 "Kiss Me" (radio remix) – 3:18
 "Sad but True" – 3:57

Japanese CD single
 "Kiss Me" (Japanese version) – 3:17
 "Kiss Me" (LP version) – 3:27
 "Kiss Me" (acoustic version) – 3:16
 "I Can't Catch You" (Ben Grosse Remix) – 3:36
 "Love" (Ben Grosse Remix) – 3:53
 "Kiss Me" (instrumental edit) – 3:18

Credits and personnel
Credits are lifted from the Sixpence None the Richer album booklet.

Studios
 Recorded at The White House (Nashville, Tennessee, US)
 Additional recording and mix at The Carport (Nashville, Tennessee, US)
 Mastered at Gateway Mastering (Portland, Maine, US)

Personnel

 Matt Slocum – words, music, guitar, cello
 Leigh Nash – vocals
 Dale Baker – drums, percussion
 J.J. Plasencio – bass
 John Mark Painter – accordion, additional engineering
 Phil Madeira – B-3
 Steve Taylor – production
 Russ Long – mixing, engineering
 Andreas Krause – additional engineering
 Tony Palacios – additional engineering
 Chris Grainger – second engineering
 Bob Ludwig – mastering

Charts

Weekly charts

Year-end charts

Certifications

Release history

Covers
As a solo artist, Nash recorded a cover of the song for her 2018 EP and sings it as part of her live sets. The song has been covered by Avril Lavigne, UK R&B singer Nathan, Lava Lava on their album Tour Demo, and New Found Glory on their album From the Screen to Your Stereo Part II. The New Found Glory version has been released as a single with a music video. "Kiss Me" has also been covered by Singaporean Olivia Ong on her album A Girl Meets Bossa Nova 2. A cover by Debbie Scott appeared in the game Pump It Up: Exceed. A cover of the song was put in the game Karaoke Revolution. The song was covered on the eighth series of The X Factor by Janet Devlin in Week 7. In 2019, SZA performed a cover version as part of her set at the III Points Festival. In August 2021, Cyn recorded a cover version of the song for the soundtrack to the Netflix film, He's All That.

References

External links
 

Songs about kissing
1990s ballads
1997 songs
1998 singles
1999 singles
2007 singles
Black-and-white music videos
Columbia Records singles
Elektra Records singles
New Found Glory songs
Number-one singles in Australia
Pop ballads
RPM Top Singles number-one singles
Sixpence None the Richer songs
Comedy television theme songs